Frederick II of Brandenburg (19 November 1413 – 10 February 1471), nicknamed "the Iron" (der Eiserne) and sometimes "Irontooth" (Eisenzahn), was a Prince-elector of the Margraviate of Brandenburg from 1440 until his abdication in 1470, and was a member of the House of Hohenzollern.

Biography
Frederick II was born at Tangermünde Castle (German: Burg Tangermünde), when Tangermünde was within the Margraviate of Brandenburg, to Frederick I, Brandenburg's first Hohenzollern ruler, and his wife Elizabeth, daughter of Frederick, Duke of Bavaria-Landshut, and Maddalena Visconti. The latter was a daughter of Bernabò Visconti and Beatrice della Scala. As the second son, his brothers included John the Alchemist and Albert Achilles, both of whom also ruled Brandenburg as margraves.

In 1421, at age 8, Frederick was betrothed to Hedwig Jagiellon, but she died on 8 December 1431, before the marriage could take place.

When Frederick I retired in 1437, he compensated his incapable eldest son John with the Principality of Bayreuth while Frederick II assumed the government of Brandenburg. Unlike his father, he turned away from imperial politics and concentrated on his efforts to pacify the nobility and towns of the electorate. Quarrels with the city of Berlin began in 1440 with his plans to build a new residence on the Cölln island of the Spree river. In 1448 the Berliner Unwille (indignation) against the cession of the city's territory for an electoral stronghold culminated in open revolt, when the citizens flooded the excavation of the future Stadtschloss. Nevertheless, Frederick II prevailed, had the palace built and the city's rights decisively curtailed.

In 1453, Frederick II, in his position as the Margrave of Brandenburg, was sent a letter from Rhodes, penned by the Grand Master of the Knights of St John, notifying him of the Fall of Constantinople and requesting he send them support so as to allow them to continue to combat the Turkish threat. His response is unknown.

In 1454 and 1455, he concluded the Treaties of Cölln and Mewe and thereby re-gained the Neumark (New March) from the Teutonic Order state. Weary of the long struggle with the Duchy of Pomerania, he abdicated in 1470 in favour of his younger brother Albert Achilles, he retired to the Bayreuth Principality and died one year later in Neustadt an der Aisch.

Family and children
On 11 June 1441, Frederick II married Catherine of Saxony (1421 – August 23, 1476), a daughter of Elector Frederick I of Saxony and Katharina of Brunswick-Lüneburg. They had three children (and Frederick had one bastard):

Dorothea of Brandenburg (c. 1446 – March, 1519), married Duke John V of Saxe-Lauenburg on 12 February 1464.
Margaret of Brandenburg (c. 1450 – 1489), married Bogislaw X, Duke of Pomerania.
Johan of Brandenburg (December 23, 14{06-16} - 1454)
Erasmus von Brandenburg (c. 1452 - 1465).

Ancestors

References

External links

1413 births
1471 deaths
People from Stendal (district)
15th-century German people
Prince-electors of Brandenburg
Margraves of Bayreuth
House of Hohenzollern
Burials at Heilsbronn Abbey